ARM System-on-Chip Architecture is a book detailing the system on a chip ARM architecture, as a specific implementation of reduced instruction set computing. It was written by Steve Furber, who co-designed the ARM processor with Sophie Wilson.

The book's content covers the architecture, assembly language programming, support mechanisms for high-level programming languages, the instruction set and the building of operating systems. The Thumb instruction set is also covered in detail.

It has been cited in numerous academic papers, and has been recommended to those working in the development of embedded systems.

References 

2000 non-fiction books
ARM architecture
Computer books
Handbooks and manuals
System on a chip